William Irwin (born May 20, 1968, Niagara Falls, Ontario, nicknamed "Billy the Kid", is a retired Canadian amateur lightweight and professional light/light welter/welterweight boxer of the 1990s and 2000s who as an amateur won a bronze medal in the Boxing at the 1991 Pan American Games in Havana, Cuba, losing to eventual silver medal winner Patrice Brooks of the United States, represented Canada at the 1991 World Amateur Boxing Championships in Sydney, Australia losing to Julien Lorcy of France. He represented Canada at the 1992 Summer Olympics in Barcelona but was stopped in the second round of the lightweight division (– 60 kg) by Ronald Chavez of the Philippines. 

Irwin's last stand was in 2005, up against the undefeated World Champion Juan Diaz. After losing to Diaz, Irwin walked away in class retiring from a very respectable pro boxing career that spanned over 12 years. He was a four time Canadian National Champion, a Bronze Medalist at the Pan-American Games, with an amateur record of 130-20-0 and with an impressive professional boxing record of 44 (31)–5-0. 

He now trains amateurs, upcoming international fighters and professional boxers in Niagara Falls, Ontario. One of his fighters won the 2012 Canadian Champion Best Youth Boxer Award.

References

External links
 
 
 
 
 

1968 births
Lightweight boxers
Living people
Boxers at the 1990 Commonwealth Games
Boxers at the 1991 Pan American Games
Boxers at the 1992 Summer Olympics
Olympic boxers of Canada
Commonwealth Games competitors for Canada
Pan American Games bronze medalists for Canada
Sportspeople from Niagara Falls, Ontario
Canadian male boxers
Pan American Games medalists in boxing
Medalists at the 1991 Pan American Games